Tao Dan Station (Vietnamese: Ga Tao Đàn) is a future underground Ho Chi Minh City Metro station on Line 2. The station will be located under Tao Dan Park.

References 
Ho Chi Minh City Metro stations
Proposed buildings and structures in Vietnam
Railway stations scheduled to open in 2030